Urpo Paavo Pikkupeura, a.k.a. Upi, (born March 22, 1957 in Rovaniemi) is a former ice speed skater from Finland, who represented his native country at the 1984 Winter Olympics in Sarajevo, Yugoslavia.

References

External links
 SkateResults

1957 births
Living people
Finnish male speed skaters
Speed skaters at the 1984 Winter Olympics
Olympic speed skaters of Finland
People from Rovaniemi
Sportspeople from Lapland (Finland)